Once Upon a Time the City of Fools is Italian television film of two episodes.

The film was shot in 2009. Its screenplay was written by Marco Turco, who also directed it. Rai Fiction and Ciao Ragazzi! produced the film under the direction of Claudia Mori. The film was shown at Bari International Film & TV Festival on 25 January 2010 in Teatro Petruzzelli as well as on 7 and 8 February 2010 at TV channel Rai Uno.

The film includes two episodes. The first episode of the film was watched by 5.442 million viewers, the second one was watched by 5.9 million viewers.

Plot
The film treats of the activities of Franco Basaglia who revolutionized Italian psychiatry and shows the degrading situation that existed in Italian psychiatric hospitals before the passing of Basaglia Law.

Awards
The film has received Golden Nymphs Award as the best film and for the best man role in the film at Festival de Television in Montecarlo and Silver Magnolia Award for Best Television Film at the 16th Shanghai Television Festival.

References

External links
 

2010 television films
2010 films
Italian television films
2010s Italian-language films
2010 biographical drama films
Italian biographical drama films
Films about psychiatry
Films set in Italy
Films shot in Rome
Films set in the 20th century
2010 drama films
2010s Italian films